Bottike or Bottice  was a western region of ancient Chalcidice, inhabited by Bottiaeans, who, were expelled from their homeland Bottiaea by Macedonians sometime in the Archaic period . Their chief polis was Spartolos. Bottiaeans were members and allies of the Delian League. In 432 they revolted from Athens, along with the Chalkidian League, but in 422 they entered in an alliance with the Athenians. It seems from the inscriptions that they had formed a confederacy (koinon) and struck silver and bronze coins. There were between six and twelve  Bottiaean cities but not all of them inside Bottike. According to Herodotus (8.127) Olynthus, close to Bottike, was originally a Bottiaean community.

Bottike is mentioned by Thucydides and Xenophon in the battles taken place in Chalcidice between late 5th and early 4th century BC. Bottikois, which means for Bottic ones) is only mentioned in epigraphy. After the conquest by Philip II, unlike Bottiaea, the name of Bottike disappeared.

References

An inventory of archaic and classical poleis By Mogens Herman Hansen, Thomas Heine Nielsen, Københavns universitet Page 811 
Studies in the ancient Greek polis By Mogens Herman Hansen, Kurt A. Raaflaub Page 105

External links
Coins of Bottice
Coins of Bottice, Chalcidian allied type

Geography of ancient Chalcidice